Four Star Mary is an alternative rock group formed in California in 1997. The band named themselves after the Four Star vs. Mary legal case, in which Mary attempted to sue US oil company ExxonMobil.

Appearance in Buffy the Vampire Slayer

Lead singer Tad Looney, guitarist Michael ‘Zu’ Zufelt, bassist Steve Carter, drummer Chris Sobchack  and rhythm guitarist Derrick Tanner made up the fictitious band Dingoes Ate My Baby in which Oz (Seth Green) plays lead guitar in Seasons Two, Three and Four of Buffy the Vampire Slayer. They have also had tracks featured on the shows Party of Five, Road Rules, The Real World and Charmed.

According to an interview in The Watcher’s Guide, music editor John King heard their music at a party hosted by Steve Carter’s girlfriend and thought they would be good on the show. Joss Whedon decided that they had the right sound for the fictitious band he wanted. In Buffy, they played at several posting board and cast/crew parties.

Their 2001 single "Pain" is on the original soundtrack CD for the show.

Discography 
 Four Star Mary (EP), 1997
 Thrown to the Wolves (album), 1998
 "Marlene/Think" (double A-side single), 2000
 Thrown to the Wolves (album), 2001 (UK re-release)
 "Dilate" (single), 2001 (UK, spitfire records)
 "Pain" (single), 2001 (UK, spitfire records)
 Stripped 
 Welcome Home (album), 2002
 Live And Unheard Of (EP), 2003 (Limited edition)
  "Rio" (single), 2004
 Hello It's Me (album), 2006
 Pieces pt. I (EP), 2016

References

External links

, relaunched on October 1, 2013
 Fan Site
UK Fan Site
Video to "Pain"
Video to "Dilate"

Alternative rock groups from California
Musical groups established in 1997